4'-Hydroxyisoflavone methyltransferase may refer to:
 Isoflavone 4'-O-methyltransferase, an enzyme
 Flavonoid 4'-O-methyltransferase, an enzyme